The Canadian Mixed Doubles Curling Olympic Trials, known as the Canad Inns Canadian Mixed Doubles Trials  since 2018 for sponsorship reasons, occur every four years, in the year preceding the Winter Olympic Games. These trials have been used to determine the Canadian representatives in the year's Winter Olympic Games since mixed doubles curling was added to the Olympic program for the 2018 Winter Olympic games.

Members of Canada's Olympic four-player teams are not eligible to compete in the Canadian Mixed Doubles Trials because of the rigours of the Olympic curling schedule. If a player's teammate qualified for the Olympics as part of a four-player team, the player must name a replacement to compete alongside them in the Trials.

Champions

References

Mixed doubles curling
2018 establishments in Canada
Recurring sporting events established in 2018